Bruce Makovah (born 3 November 1969) is a former Zimbabwean cricketer. He was a right-handed batsman and a right-arm medium-pace bowler who played for Mashonaland Under-24s. He was born in Fort Victoria (now Masvingo).

Makovah made two appearances for the team in the Logan Cup competition of 1994/95, including one in the final of the competition. Makovah scored a duck in his debut innings, and bowled economically in the match, taking two wickets.

Makovah's second and final appearance came in the final of the competition against Mashonaland. The game saw two Mashonaland batsmen score heavily, Gary Martin and Ali Shah scoring first-class bests.

Makovah was a tailend batsman.

External links
Bruce Makovah at Cricket Archive 

1969 births
Living people
Zimbabwean cricketers